Clarbeston is a village and parish in Pembrokeshire, Wales,  east of Haverfordwest. The parish, together with Wiston and Walton East, constitute the community of Wiston. The population was 318 at the 2011 census.

Name
The English placename means "Clarenbald's farm", Clarenbald being a continental Germanic (perhaps Flemish) personal name.  The Welsh placename is a translation of the English.

Location
Clarbeston Road railway station and the surrounding settlement and post town of Clarbeston Road lie to the west of the village.

Parish
The parish is close to, or on, the Pembrokeshire language frontier and has always had a somewhat fluctuating proportion of Welsh speakers.

Its census populations were: 180 (1801), 178 (1851), 158 (1901), 114 (1951), 71 (1981)

The percentage of Welsh speakers was 41 (1891), 44 (1931), 27 (1971).

References

External links 

Historical information and further sources on GENUKI

Villages in Pembrokeshire